Thatcheria waitaraensis is an extinct species of sea snail, a marine gastropod mollusk in the family Raphitomidae.

Description

Distribution
Fossils of this marine species were found in Upper Miocene strata in New Zealand

References

 Marwick, J. (1926). New Tertiary Mollusca from North Taranaki. Transactions of the New Zealand Institute. 56: 317–331.
 Maxwell, P.A. (2009). Cenozoic Mollusca. pp 232–254 in Gordon, D.P. (ed.) New Zealand inventory of biodiversity. Volume one. Kingdom Animalia: Radiata, Lophotrochozoa, Deuterostomia. Canterbury University Press, Christchurch

External links
 A.J. Charig, The Gastropod Genus Thatcheria and its Relationships; Bulletin of the British Museum (Natural History), vol.  7 # 9 (1963)

waitaraensis
Gastropods described in 1926
Gastropods of New Zealand